Dejene Berhanu (December 12, 1980 – August 29, 2010) was a male Ethiopian runner, who specialized in the 5000 metres.

Berhanu finished 11th in the short race at the 2004 World Cross Country Championships and fifth in the 5000 at the Athens Olympics. He followed that up with a pair of strong finishes at the World Cross Country Championships the next year. Berhanu was seventh in the short race and sixth in the long race. He ran in the 5000 again at the World Championships at Helsinki, finishing eighth.

In 2006, Berhanu turned to focus on the marathon. He eschewed cross country for the Rotterdam Marathon, where he finished fourth in a time of 2:08:46. He ran the Chicago Marathon in the fall as a last-minute replacement for favourite Felix Limo. Running with the leaders through the halfway mark in a blistering 63:15, Berhanu faded after 30 km and finished ninth in a time of 2:12:27.

Death
Berhanu committed suicide on August 29, 2010, in Ethiopia, at age 29.

Achievements

Personal bests
3000 metres – 8:06.56 (2002)
5000 metres – 12:54.15 (2004)
10,000 metres – 27:12.22 (2005)
Marathon – 2:08:46 (2006)

References

marathoninfo

1980 births
2010 deaths
Ethiopian male long-distance runners
Athletes (track and field) at the 2004 Summer Olympics
Olympic athletes of Ethiopia
Sportspeople from Oromia Region
African Games bronze medalists for Ethiopia
African Games medalists in athletics (track and field)
Athletes (track and field) at the 2003 All-Africa Games
Suicides in Ethiopia